

The General Aircraft ST-18 Croydon was a 1930s British cabin monoplane built by General Aircraft Limited.

Development
Following the mixed success of the earlier Monospar family of aircraft, the company designed a ten-seat light transport, the ST-18 (later named Croydon). Due to the longer-span wing, it was not a cantilever monospar wing but had to be fitted with bracing struts. The ST-18 was a low-wing monoplane, with a conventional tail unit and tailwheel landing gear, and hydraulically retractable main gear. It was powered by two Pratt & Whitney Wasp Junior radial engines mounted on the wing leading edges. It had a crew of three, and a cabin for ten passengers, a toilet and baggage compartment.

Operational history
On 16 November 1935, the sole aircraft (T22, later G-AECB) first flew at Hanworth Aerodrome, piloted by Harry M. Schofield. It performed well, but did not attract any orders, so the aircraft was prepared to establish a record for an Australia to England flight. On 30 July 1936, Lord Sempill, Harold "Tim" Wood, and two other crew left Croydon Airport for Australia. On 7 October 1936, during the return flight from Darwin, navigation errors occurred during the flight over the Timor Sea, and the aircraft made a successful forced landing on a coral reef (Seringapatam Reef). The crew members were immediately transported off the reef by local fishermen, and the aircraft was abandoned.

Specifications

Notes

References

 The Illustrated Encyclopedia of Aircraft (Part Work 1982-1985), 1985, Orbis Publishing, Page 1938
 A.J.Jackson, British Civil Aircraft since 1919 Volume 2, Putnam & Company, London, 1974, Page 310

1930s British civil utility aircraft
Croydon
Low-wing aircraft
Aircraft first flown in 1935
Twin piston-engined tractor aircraft